The 1974–75 Shell Shield season was the ninth edition of what is now the Regional Four Day Competition, the domestic first-class cricket competition for the countries of the West Indies Cricket Board (WICB). The tournament was sponsored by Royal Dutch Shell, with matches played from 14 March to 11 April 1975 (a much shorter duration than in previous seasons).

Five teams contested the competition – Barbados, the Combined Islands, Guyana, Jamaica, and Trinidad and Tobago. Owing to a high number of draws (only four of the ten matches were played to completion), three teams finished the round-robin undefeated. Of those, Guyana had the most points, thus claiming their second Shell Shield title. Guyanese batsman Roy Fredericks led the tournament in runs, while Combined Islands fast bowler Andy Roberts was the leading wicket-taker.

Points table

Key

 W – Outright win (12 points)
 L – Outright loss (0 points)
 LWF – Lost match, but won first innings (4 points)

 DWF – Drawn, but won first innings (6 points)
 DLF – Drawn, but lost first innings (2 points)
 Pts – Total points

Statistics

Most runs
The top five run-scorers are included in this table, listed by runs scored and then by batting average.

Most wickets

The top five wicket-takers are listed in this table, listed by wickets taken and then by bowling average.

References

West Indian cricket seasons from 1970–71 to 1999–2000
1975 in West Indian cricket
Regional Four Day Competition seasons
Domestic cricket competitions in 1974–75